Richard Hermann Antoine Bouwens van der Boijen (11 October 1863 – 31 August 1939) was a French architect. In 1901, he was one of the winners of the Concours de façades de la ville de Paris for the realization of an Hôtel particulier, 8, rue de Lota in the 16th arrondissement of Paris. In the 1930s, he was an exponent of the Art Deco style; with French architect Roger-Henri Expert, Bouwens was given overall responsibility for the interior design of the SS Normandie.

He is buried at Père-Lachaise Cemetery (36th division).

Some creations 
 1905: 27 bis quai Anatole-France (Paris)
 1905: 27 quai Anatole-France	(Paris)
 1902: Le Centorial (Paris)
 1899: Hôtel particulier, 8, rue de Lota (16th)
 Hôtel particulier, 6, rue de Chézy (Neuilly-sur-Seine)
 Hôtel particulier, 8, rue de Chézy (Neuilly-sur-Seine)
 Paquebot Ile-de-France, créateur de la grande descente de la salle à manger

References

Bibliography 

 « Archives d'architecture du XXe siècle, Volume 1 », 1991
 Hélène Guéné, « Décoration et haute couture : Armand Albert Rateau pour Jeanne Lanvin, un autre Art déco », 2006
 François Roux, « Les architectes élèves de l'Ecole des beaux-arts : 1783-1907 », 2007

External links 
 Richard Bouwens van der Boijen on data.bnf.fr
 Richard Bouwens van der Boijen  Notice on Structurae
 Richard Bouwens van der Boijen on PS archi-EU
 Immeuble Bouwens (1905)
 8 rue de Lota (16e arrondissement)

19th-century French architects
20th-century French architects
Officiers of the Légion d'honneur
Architects from Paris
1863 births
1939 deaths
Burials at Père Lachaise Cemetery